Carlton Eugene Powell, Jr. (born August 14, 1985) is a former American football defensive tackle. He was drafted by the Denver Broncos in the fifth round of the 2008 NFL Draft. He played college football at Virginia Tech.

Powell was also a member of the Cleveland Browns, Tampa Bay Buccaneers, New York Jets, Atlanta Falcons, and New York Giants.

Professional career

Pre-draft

First stint with Broncos
Powell was drafted by the Denver Broncos in the fifth round of the 2008 NFL Draft. He was placed on the PUP list on July 25, 2008 with a ruptured Achilles tendon. He was waived on September 4, 2009.

Cleveland Browns
Powell was signed to the Cleveland Browns practice squad on October 6, 2009 and released on October 20.

Second stint with Broncos
Powell was re-signed by the Denver Broncos on November 3, 2009 and placed on the practice squad.

Tampa Bay Buccaneers
Powell was signed by the Tampa Bay Buccaneers on May 18, 2010. He was released on September 4.

New York Jets
Powell was signed to a reserve/future contract by the New York Jets on January 5, 2011. He was waived on August 11.

Atlanta Falcons
On August 14, 2011, Powell signed with the Atlanta Falcons. He was released on December 2, 2011. He was signed to the practice squad on December 6, 2011.

New York Giants
Powell was signed by the New York Giants on August 14, 2012.

References

External links
Virginia Tech Hokies bio

1985 births
Living people
American football defensive tackles
Virginia Tech Hokies football players
Denver Broncos players
Cleveland Browns players
Tampa Bay Buccaneers players
New York Giants players
New York Jets players
Players of American football from Norfolk, Virginia
Atlanta Falcons players